Alexis Texas (born May 25, 1985) is an American pornographic actress. In 2020, Texas was characterized as one of "the most popular porn performers", based on her Instagram following of around 3.8 million followers. She was inducted into the AVN Hall of Fame in 2022.

Early life and education
Texas spent her early life in Castroville, Texas. She is of Puerto Rican, Norwegian, and German descent. She attended Texas State University, studying respiratory care therapy, and received an associate's degree. At age 21, while working at a restaurant, she was offered a job in the adult industry.

Career

Pornographic acting and recognition
Texas's first scene was with Jack Venice in Shane's World's College Amateur Tour in Texas, filmed in October 2006, followed by several scenes for Bang Bros in Florida. She moved to Los Angeles and began shooting scenes for LA Direct Models in March 2007. Adult performer Belladonna  directed Discovering Alexis Texas, released in February 2008. Later that year, she won the NightMoves Award for Best New Starlet. Genesis magazine featured Texas on its cover in April 2009, as did Hustler on the magazine's 35th anniversary edition in June 2009. Best of Hustler Magazine and Hustler XXX featured Texas on their covers that year. Texas launched her official website and formed her own company, Alexis Texas Entertainment, as a subsidiary of Starlet Entertainment Group, in 2009. Her website won an XBIZ Award for Performer Site of the Year. In 2010, Maxim  named her one of the 12 top female stars in porn. She was credited the same year with an acting role in the film Bikini Frankenstein.

Mainstream cinema and directing
In 2011, Texas starred in the comedy horror film Bloodlust Zombies. Credited with the lead role in the film, it was her first performance in mainstream cinema. She also appeared in the music video for "Bandz a Make Her Dance" by Juicy J in 2012. By 2012, Texas had appeared in over 400 adult films. That year, she signed an exclusive, one-year contract with the company Adam & Eve. The Big Butt Book, published in 2010, featured her as the cover model. In its review of the book, Erotic Review called Texas "arguably the most celebrated butt in porn nowadays". In 2013, she was one of the 16 actresses portrayed in Deborah Anderson's documentary film Aroused. In its review of the film, The Hollywood Reporter described her as a "well-known" porn star. The Los Angeles Times was critical of Aroused, writing, "Completist fans of such performers as Alexis Texas, Katsuni, and Misty Stone are the only likely viewers liable to find the documentary satisfying." She subsequently appeared, via archival footage, in the 2013 romantic comedy film Don Jon, written and directed by Joseph Gordon-Levitt. In 2014, International Business Times placed her among "the most popular names in the adult industry".

In June 2015, Elegant Angel signed her to an exclusive directing contract. Her directorial debut, Big Booty Tryouts, was released the following month. She appeared in all the film's scenes, which were the first ones she had shot after a nearly two-year hiatus from performing. Texas directed a cast that included Anikka Albrite, Abella Danger, AJ Applegate, Keisha Grey, and Dani Daniels. She also directed The Real Buttwoman Returns, which featured her first gangbang scene. Texas was selected as co-host of the 2015 AVN Awards. She signed an exclusive acting deal with Elegant Angel in 2016.

Music 
In 2021, Texas played as a dancer in a music video for "Tehran, Tokyo" by Iranian pop/hip-hop musician Sasy. The music video features actresses, including Texas, gyrating atop cars and inside bars. This clip racked up about 18 million views within one week, and has also been criticized by Iranians for exposing Sasy's fans to porn.

Social media and evolving career
In her 2018 book Female Genital Cosmetic Surgery, gender studies scholar Camille Nurka described Texas as "one of the most successful porn stars of the last decade". The same year, in the song "Yacht Club" on the album Nuthin' 2 Prove, rapper Lil Yachty included her as a pop culture reference. Texas directed Kleio Valentien, Jenna Foxx, Sammie Six, Dava Foxx, Jayde Cole, Ana Foxxx, and Zoey Monroe in the 2019 Elegant Angel release Alexis Texas: Lesbian House Party. Las Vegas Weekly observed in 2019 that Texas was a sought-after guest and "perennially popular" at the annual AVN Adult Entertainment Expo. In his 2020 book Human Resource Management in the Pornography Industry author David M. Kopp noted Texas was one of "the most popular porn performers", according to her large following on Instagram – 3.8 million followers. In 2020, Texas said she had not filmed any new adult scenes for four years, focusing instead on evolving her career and her podcast, Private Talk With Alexis Texas. She released her podcast via Apple Podcasts, YouTube, and Podbay.fm. Texas interviewed singer-songwriter and record producer Ne-Yo on her podcast in February 2020.

Personal life
She was married to pornographic actor Mr. Pete from 2008 to 2013.

Awards and nominations

See also
List of pornographic performers by decade
List of pornographic actors who appeared in mainstream films

References

External links

 
 
 
 

1985 births
21st-century American actresses
American female erotic dancers
American erotic dancers
American pornographic film actresses
American pornographic film directors
American female adult models
Living people
People from Greater San Antonio
Pornographic film actors from Texas
Radio personalities from Texas
Women pornographic film directors
American people of German descent
American people of Norwegian descent
American people of Puerto Rican descent
Texas State University alumni
AVN Award winners